Jeremy Michael Fitz-Kennedy (born September 16, 1992) is a Canadian mixed martial artist, currently competing in the Featherweight division of Bellator MMA. In addition to competing for Bellator, Kennedy has also competed in the Ultimate Fighting Championship (UFC) and the Professional Fighters League (PFL). As of February 28, 2023, he is #2 in the Bellator Featherweight Rankings.

Background
Kennedy was born and raised in Fleetwood, Surrey, British Columbia, Canada. He started training boxing and Brazilian jiu-jitsu at the age of 13 to put up with his older brother. He graduated from Fleetwood Park Secondary School.

Mixed martial arts career

Early career
Before joining the UFC, Kennedy held both the Battlefield Fight League Amateur and Professional Featherweight Championships while amassing an amateur record of 8–1 and a professional record of 8–0.

Ultimate Fighting Championship
Kennedy made his promotional debut on August 27, 2016 at UFC on Fox 21 against Alessandro Ricci. He won the fight by unanimous decision.

Kennedy was briefly tabbed as a short notice replacement to face Mirsad Bektic on October 8, 2016 at UFC 204. Subsequently, after his participation was publicly confirmed, Kennedy indicated he was injured and unable to take the fight. He was replaced by Russell Doane.

Kennedy next faced Rony Jason on March 11, 2017 at UFC Fight Night 106. He won the bout by unanimous decision.

Kennedy faced Kyle Bochniak on July 22, 2017 at UFC on Fox 25. Kennedy won the fight via unanimous decision.

Kennedy was scheduled to face Alexander Volkanovski  at UFC Fight Night: Hunt vs. Tybura on 19 November 2017. However, Kennedy pulled out of the fight on October 5 citing a back injury.

The bout with Volkanovski was rescheduled and took place on February 11, 2018 at UFC 221. He lost the fight via technical knockout in round two.

Brave CF
Kennedy's contract with the UFC ended after the Volkanovski bout and Kennedy grew tired of the contract negotiations for renewing, eventually leading him to sign with a new promotion - Brave CF. Kennedy headlined Brave 14 against Danyel Pilo on August 18, 2018. He won the fight via knockout in round one.

Kennedy was expected to face Marcos Galvão at PFL 8 for the alternate spot in the Professional Fighters League's 2018 featherweight tournament. Due to a misunderstanding when making the contract with Brave CF, Kennedy assumed he was eligible to compete in other organizations' events. Just before Kennedy's fight, Brave CF officials contacted PFL to deny him from fighting. Briefly after the news surfaced, Brave CF officials revealed that Kennedy had signed a bout agreement to fight Marat Magomedov at Brave 18 on November 16, 2018.

Kennedy headlined Brave 21 against Magomedov on December 28, 2018. He won the fight via TKO in the third round.

PFL
In 2019, Kennedy joined the Professional Fighters League as an entrant in their 2019 Featherweight tournament. He was scheduled to face Alexandre Bezerra in the opening round, but Bezerra missed weight and was replaced by Luis Rafael Laurentino. Kennedy lost the fight via TKO in the first round.

In the second round of PFL 2 regular season, Kennedy faced Steven Siler at PFL 5 on July 25, 2019. He won the fight by unanimous decision and advanced to the playoffs.

In the quarterfinals, Kennedy faced Luis Rafael 

Laurentino at PFL 8 on October 17, 2019. He won the fight via second-round knockout and advanced to the semifinals contested later on the same day. In semifinals Kennedy lost to Daniel Pineda via first round submission and was eliminated from the tournament. However, Pineda tested positive for a banned substance and the result was overturned to no contest.

Bellator MMA
Kennedy signed with Bellator MMA in October 2020. He made his promotional debut against Matt Bessette at Bellator 253 on November 19, 2020. Kennedy won the fight by unanimous decision.

Kennedy faced Ádám Borics on April 9, 2021 at Bellator 256. He lost the bout via unanimous decision. 

Kennedy faced Emmanuel Sanchez on December 3, 2021 at Bellator 272. He won the bout via unanimous decision.

Kennedy was scheduled to face Aaron Pico on April 15, 2022 at Bellator 277. However, due to unknown reasons, Kennedy withdrew 8 days before the event.

The bout against Aaron Pico was rebooked for October 1, 2022 at Bellator 286. After Pico hurt his shoulder mid way through the first round, the bout was stopped after the first round by the doctor.

Kennedy faced Pedro Carvalho on February 25, 2023 at Bellator 291. He won the fight by unanimous decision.

Mixed martial arts record

|-
|Win
|align=center|19–3 (1)
|Pedro Carvalho
|Decision (unanimous)
|Bellator 291
|
|align=center|3
|align=center|5:00
|Dublin, Ireland
|
|-
|Win
|align=center|18–3 (1)
|Aaron Pico
|TKO (shoulder injury)
|Bellator 286
|
|align=center|1
|align=center|5:00
|Long Beach, California, United States
|
|-
|Win
|align=center|17–3 (1)
|Emmanuel Sanchez
|Decision (unanimous)
|Bellator 272
|
|align=center|3
|align=center|5:00
|Uncasville, Connecticut, United States
|
|-
|Loss
|align=center|16–3 (1)
|Ádám Borics
|Decision (unanimous)
|Bellator 256 
|
|align=center|3
|align=center|5:00
|Uncasville, Connecticut, United States 
|
|-
|Win
|align=center|16–2 (1) 
|Matt Bessette
|Decision (unanimous)
|Bellator 253
|
|align=center|3
|align=center|5:00
|Uncasville, Connecticut, United States
|
|-
|NC
|align=center|
|Daniel Pineda
|NC (overturned)
|rowspan=2 | PFL 8
|rowspan=2 | 
|align=center| 1
|align=center| 4:00
|rowspan=2 | Las Vegas, Nevada, United States
|
|-
|Win
|align=center| 15–2
|Luis Rafael Laurentino 
|TKO (punches)
|align=center|2
|align=center|1:24
|
|-
|Win
|align=center|14–2
|Steven Siler
|Decision (unanimous)
|PFL 5
|
|align=center|3
|align=center|5:00
|Atlantic City, New Jersey, United States 
|
|-
|Loss
|align=center| 13–2
|Luis Rafael Laurentino 
|TKO (punches)
|PFL 2
|
|align=center|1
|align=center|0:23
|Uniondale, New York, United States
|
|-
|Win
|align=center| 13–1
|Marat Magomedov
|TKO (punches)
|Brave 21
|
|align=center|3
|align=center|1:08
|Jeddah, Saudi Arabia
|
|-
|Win
|align=center| 12–1
|Danyel Pilo
|KO (elbows)
|Brave 14
|
|align=center|1
|align=center|2:02
|Tangier, Morocco
|
|-
|Loss
|align=center| 11–1
|Alexander Volkanovski
|TKO (punches and elbows)
|UFC 221 
|
|align=center|2
|align=center|4:57
|Perth, Australia
|
|-
|Win
|align=center| 11–0
|Kyle Bochniak
|Decision (unanimous)
|UFC on Fox: Weidman vs. Gastelum 
|
|align=center|3
|align=center|5:00
|Uniondale, New York, United States
|
|-
|Win
|align=center| 10–0
|Rony Jason
|Decision (unanimous)
|UFC Fight Night: Belfort vs. Gastelum
|
|align=center|3
|align=center|5:00
|Fortaleza, Brazil
|
|-
|Win
|align=center| 9–0
|Alessandro Ricci
|Decision (unanimous)
|UFC on Fox: Maia vs. Condit
|
|align=center|3
|align=center|5:00
|Vancouver, British Columbia, Canada
|
|-
|Win
|align=center| 8–0
|Drew Brokenshire
|Decision (unanimous)
|BFL 43
|
|align=center|3
|align=center|5:00
|Coquitlam, British Columbia, Canada
|
|-
|Win
|align=center| 7–0
|Mario Pereira
|Decision (unanimous)
|BFL 34
|
|align=center|5
|align=center|5:00
|Richmond, British Columbia, Canada
|
|-
|Win
|align=center|6–0
|Andre Da Silva
|Submission (rear-naked choke)
|BFL 32
|
|align=center|2
|align=center|3:15
|Richmond, British Columbia, Canada
|
|-
|Win
|align=center|5–0
|Matthew Middleton
|Submission (Peruvian necktie)
|CMFC: Chiang Mai Fighting Championship 4
|
|align=center|1
|align=center|2:35
|Chiang Mai, Thailand
|
|-
|Win
|align=center|4–0
|Viktor Larsson
|TKO (punches)
|SMMAF: Songkran MMA Festival
|
|align=center|2
|align=center|0:00
|Hua Hin, Thailand
|
|-
|Win
|align=center|3–0
|Natthapol Thanaruethai
|KO (punches)
|CMFC: Chiang Mai Fighting Championship 2
|
|align=center|1
|align=center|3:58
|Chiang Mai, Thailand
|
|-
|Win
|align=center|2–0
|Blake Shearing
|TKO (doctor stoppage)
|FFL 10
|
|align=center|2
|align=center|2:11
|Grand Prairie, Alberta, Canada
|
|-
|Win
|align=center|1–0
|Dan Lin
|Decision (unanimous)
|BFL 24
|
|align=center|3
|align=center|5:00
|Penticton, British Columbia, Canada
|

See also
 List of current Bellator fighters 
List of male mixed martial artists
List of Canadian UFC fighters

References

External links 
 
 

Canadian male mixed martial artists
Lightweight mixed martial artists
Mixed martial artists utilizing boxing
Mixed martial artists utilizing wrestling
Mixed martial artists utilizing Muay Thai
Mixed martial artists utilizing Brazilian jiu-jitsu
Living people
Sportspeople from Surrey, British Columbia
1992 births
Ultimate Fighting Championship male fighters
Canadian Muay Thai practitioners
Canadian practitioners of Brazilian jiu-jitsu